Joan Saura i Laporta is a Green ICV Spanish politician in Catalonia. He was born in Barcelona, Catalonia, in 1950. He studied at the Escola d'Enginyeria Tècnica (Technical Engineering School), where he specialized in Industrial Chemistry. In the beginning, he was devoted to the trade union and the neighbourhood: he enrolled into the Workers' Commissions (CCOO) in 1973, while he was working for the electrics company FECSA, and cofounded the La Florida Neighbourhood Association, in L'Hospitalet de Llobregat, 1974.

Municipal policy

He became town councillor in L'Hospitalet de Llobregat for the Unified Socialist Party of Catalonia (PSUC) in the first democratic local elections in 1979, where he participated in the formation of the government, and remained a councillor until 1991.

He also chaired (from 1983 to 1987) the Public Transport commission in Barcelona.

Parliament of Catalonia
He was elected for the third and fourth Legislatures (1988 to 1995) as deputy for Barcelona in the Catalan Parliament for the Iniciativa per Catalunya Verds (ICV) party. He was the spokesperson of his party's group and became its president in 1993.

In this Parliament he has held several positions, including membership in the Economy, Finances and Budget commission, in the Industry commission, Territorial Politics as well as various others.

Congress of the Deputies
On 3 March 1996 he was elected to the Spanish Congress of Deputies representing Barcelona Province and was re-elected at the subsequent election on 12 March 2000, where he was involved in several Parliamentary Commissions (such as Environment and Defense).

As a deputy, Joan Saura promoted several initiatives, such as a rise in the minimum wage, a fight against workplace abuses by employers, same-sex marriage and the Tobin tax. Additionally, he was strongly opposed to other ones: the Plan Hidrológico Nacional (PHN), the reform of the labour market law, the quality in teaching law, the political parties' law, the tax reform, the Prestige affair and the 2003 invasion of Iraq.

President of ICV
Within ICV, he served as vice-president from 1993 as well as the head of political relations with Spain.

At the 6th Assembly of the party in November 2000, he was elected as ICV President. In June 2002 the party formed an electoral pact with United Left, and Els Verds-Esquerra Ecologista.

A Generalitat candidate
On 25 May 2002 he was chosen as the candidate for the presidency of the Generalitat de Catalunya by the ICV-EUiA coalition. For that reason, he set up in 2002 a Participative Process and the "What do you think?" campaign, to define the axis of the party's program based on civil participation.

In the elections of 2003, his party won 9 seats in the Catalan Parliament and he, after few months of negotiation, became Minister of Institutional Relations and Participation.

References

1950 births
Initiative for Catalonia Greens politicians
Interior ministers of Catalonia
Living people
Members of the 7th Congress of Deputies (Spain)
Members of the 8th Congress of Deputies (Spain)
Members of the Parliament of Catalonia
Members of the 9th Senate of Spain
Members of the 10th Senate of Spain
Ministers of Institutional Relations and Participation of Generalitat de Catalunya
Politicians from Barcelona